Leucopogon collinus, commonly known as fringed beard-heath, is a species of flowering plant in the heath family Ericaceae and is endemic to south-eastern Australia. It is a slender, erect or spreading shrub with narrowly lance-shaped leaves, and white, tube-shaped, bearded flowers.

Description

Taxonomy and naming
Fringed beard-heath was first formally described in 1810 by Jacques Labillardière, who gave it the name Styphelia collina in his Novae Hollandiae Plantarum Specimen. In the same year, Robert Brown changed the name to Leucopogon collinus in his Prodromus Florae Novae Hollandiae et Insulae Van Diemen. The specific epithet (collinus) means "living on hills".

Distribution and habitat
Leucopogon collinus grows in woodland and coastal heath and is found south from Eden in New South Wales, in coastal areas east of Orbost and other scattered locations further westwards in inland Victoria, and is common and widespread in Tasmania.

References

collinus
Ericales of Australia
Flora of New South Wales
Flora of Victoria (Australia)
Flora of Tasmania
Plants described in 1810
Taxa named by Jacques Labillardière